Alojzy Zbigniew Nowak  (born 20 March 1956) is a Polish economist. In 2020 he was elected Rector of the University of Warsaw.

Life and education 
In 1984 he graduated with a master's degree from the SGH Warsaw School of Economics. In 1991 he earned his PhD in economic sciences at the University of Warsaw. He received tenure in economic sciences in 1995 at the same university. Between 1996 and 2002 he held a position of an associate professor. By the decision of President of Poland he received professor degree in 2002. He served two terms as a dean of the Faculty of Management of the University of Warsaw (2006–2012 and 2016–2020). In the year 2012–2016 he served as prorector at the University of Warsaw.

He also worked as an associate professor on University of Illinois at Urbana–Champaign, Exeter University and Free University of Berlin.

In 2015 he was named a member of Andrzej Duda's presidential think-tank National Development Council. Between 2017 and 2020 he was a member and the secretary of the board of the Powszechny Zakład Ubezpieczeń. Since 2017 he is a Chairman of the Board of the University Sports Association of Poland, the biggest student association in Poland.

On 17 June 2020 he was elected Rector of the University of Warsaw.

Honors 
In 2002 he was awarded Golden Cross of Merit.

References 

Rectors of universities in Poland
Academic staff of the University of Warsaw
SGH Warsaw School of Economics alumni
Polish economists
1956 births
Living people